Ok nefna tysvar Ty (Old Norse, "And Call Týr Twice", from Sigrdrífumál 6) is the third studio album by the German Viking metal band Falkenbach. The digipak version comes in a cover embossed in black and gold, and contains an Internet link to the Edda lines sung in "Donar's Oak". The album was re-released by Hammerheart Records in 2011 on 12" vinyl. Limited to 100 copies on clear vinyl and 400 copies on gold vinyl.

Track listing

Personnel
 Vratyas Vakyas - all instruments, vocals

Additional personnel
 Tyrann - additional vocals
 Hagalaz - acoustic guitar
 Boltthorn - drums
 Christophe Szpajdel - logo
 Patrick Damiani - engineering

2003 albums
Falkenbach albums
Napalm Records albums